Magnetic resonance imaging is a medical imaging technique

MRI can also refer to:

Science, healthcare, and technology
Magnetic Resonance Imaging (journal), a scientific journal
Magnetorotational instability, in astrophysics
Meuse-Rhine-Issel, a breed of cattle
Monoamine reuptake inhibitor, a type of drug class
Ruby MRI (Matz's Ruby Interpreter), the reference implementation of the Ruby programming language

Places
Manchester Royal Infirmary, a hospital in Manchester, England
Manggarai railway station, a railway station in Jakarta, Indonesia (station code MRI)
Maritime Rescue Institute, a former maritime training and rescue charity
Mauritius, IOC country code
Member of the Royal Institution of Great Britain
Mental Research Institute, Palo Alto, California, USA
Merrill Field, airport in Alaska, IATA code
Microwave Research Institute, now called Weber Research Institute, a research group at the Polytechnic Institute of New York University
Midwest Research Institute, based in Kansas City, Missouri, USA

Other uses
Mri (fictional alien species), in the Faded Sun Trilogy
mri, ISO 639-3 code for the Māori language